Moritz Karlitzek (born 12 August 1996) is a German professional volleyball player. He is a member of the Germany national team, and a silver medallist at the 2017 European Championship. At the professional club level, he plays for Indykpol AZS Olsztyn.

References

External links

 
 Player profile at LegaVolley.it 
 Player profile at PlusLiga.pl  
 Player profile at Volleybox.net

1996 births
Living people
People from Bad Kissingen (district)
Sportspeople from Lower Franconia
German men's volleyball players
German expatriate sportspeople in Italy
Expatriate volleyball players in Italy
German expatriate sportspeople in France
Expatriate volleyball players in France
German expatriate sportspeople in Poland
Expatriate volleyball players in Poland
Modena Volley players
AZS Olsztyn players
Outside hitters
21st-century German people